Anton Trishane Nonis (born 28 September 1968) is a Sri Lankan cricket coach and former player.

Playing career
Nonis played eight matches of first-class cricket for Moors Sports Club.

Coaching career
Nonis coached Air Force Sports Club, Tamil Union Cricket and Athletic Club, and Navy Sports Club in Sri Lankan domestic cricket, as well as De Mazenod College. In 2013 he coached the Qatar national under-19 cricket team.

In September 2021, Nonis was appointed head coach of the Bhutan national cricket team. His first tournament in charge was the 2022 Malaysia Quadrangular Series.

References

External links
 

1968 births
Living people
Sri Lankan cricketers
Moors Sports Club cricketers
Cricketers from Colombo
Sri Lankan cricket coaches
Sri Lankan expatriates in Bhutan